Sean Crocker (born August 31, 1996) is an American professional golfer who plays on the European Tour.

Early life and amateur career
Crocker was born in Harare, Zimbabwe. His father, Gary, was a test cricketer, who played for Zimbabwe from 1992 to 1993. They moved from Zimbabwe to California when Crocker was five due to political issues. He played collegiate golf for the University of Southern California, after transitioning from baseball to golf at the age of thirteen. In 2014, Crocker was co-medalist in the U.S. Junior Amateur and was a quarter finalist in the match play portion of the same tournament. In 2015, Crocker reached the semifinals of the U.S. Amateur, but lost to the overall winner, Bryson DeChambeau. Crocker was also a two-time All-American (2015 and 2017).

Professional career
Crocker turned professional in September 2017. After finishing in a joint 6th place in the 2018 SMBC Singapore Open, he earned an invite to his first major, the 2018 Open Championship. During this tournament, Crocker made the cut. At one stage, he was on the leaderboard in 6th place halfway through the third round and ultimately finished tied for 47th after a tough last round in windy conditions. 

The following week he had his best finish as a professional, tied for third in the Euram Bank Open on the Challenge Tour. He followed that up with a T3 at the Kazakhstan Open (with a course record 62), 3rd at the Hainan Open, 3rd at the Foshan Open and 5th at the Ras Al Khaimah Challenge Tour Grand Final (tied course record 63), to finish in the top-15 ranked players (11th) and secured his 2019 European Tour card in his rookie year as a professional. He needed just 11 starts in the season to secure his 2019 playing rights.

In July 2022, Crocker won his first European Tour event at the Hero Open in Fairmont St Andrews, Scotland. He won wire-to-wire to beat Eddie Pepperell by one shot.

Amateur wins
2013 Stockton Convention and Visitors Bureau Junior Open
2016 Monroe Invitational
2017 Italian International Amateur Championship, Chapman Grand Slam

Source:

Professional wins (1)

European Tour wins (1)

Results in major championships
Results not in chronological before 2019 and 2020.

"T" = tied
NT = No tournament due to the COVID-19 pandemic

U.S. national team appearances
Amateur
Arnold Palmer Cup: 2017 (winners)

See also
2018 Challenge Tour graduates

References

External links
 
 
 

American male golfers
USC Trojans men's golfers
European Tour golfers
Sportspeople from Harare
1996 births
Living people